Kvål is a village in the municipality of Melhus in Trøndelag county, Norway. It is located in the Gauldalen valley along the Gaula River between the villages of Ler and Melhus.

Kvål Station is located in the village along the Dovre Line, but only used for local traffic. The European route E6 highway also runs through the village.

References

Melhus
Villages in Trøndelag